Dorval–L'Île-Dorval was a former borough in the West Island area of Montreal, Quebec. It was composed of the former municipalities of Dorval and L'Île-Dorval.

The municipalities were merged into the city of Montreal by the provincial government on January 1, 2002. On June 20, 2004, both Dorval and L'Île-Dorval voted to return to being independent municipalities. This took effect January 1, 2006, dissolving the borough.

See also
 List of former boroughs
 Montreal Merger
 Municipal reorganization in Quebec

Former Montreal boroughs
2002 establishments in Quebec
2006 disestablishments in Quebec
Dorval

fr:Dorval–L'Île-Dorval